

Mertens is a surname of Flemish Origin, meaning "son of Merten" (Martin). It is the fifth most common name in Belgium with 18,518 people in 2008.

Geographical distribution
As of 2014, 43.4% of all known bearers of the surname Mertens were residents of Germany (frequency 1:2,728), 34.8% of Belgium (1:487), 8.8% of the United States (1:60,847), 5.9% of the Netherlands (1:4,188), 1.7% of France (1:57,632) and 1.0% of Brazil (1:299,871).

In Belgium, the frequency of the surname was higher than national average (1:487) only in one region: Flemish Region (1:367).

In Germany, the frequency of the surname was higher than national average (1:2,728) in the following regions:
 1. North Rhine-Westphalia (1:970)
 2. Saxony-Anhalt (1:1,361)

In the Netherlands, the frequency of the surname was higher than national average (1:4,188) in the following provinces:.
 1. Limburg (1:959)
 2. North Brabant (1:2,002)

Noble House of Mertens de Wilmars 

 Charles Mertens de Wilmars (1921–1994), Belgian psychiatrist
 Josse Mertens de Wilmars (1912–2002), Belgian jurist

Others

C
 Charles Mertens (1862-1919), Belgian painter, printmaker and illustrator
 Claas Mertens (born 1992), German rower
 Conner Mertens (born ca. 1994), American football player

D
 Dries Mertens (born 1987), Belgian footballer
 Dylan Mertens (born 1995), Dutch footballer

E
 Elise Mertens (born 1995), Belgian tennis player
 Els Mertens (born 1966), Belgian racing cyclist
 Ewald Mertens (1909–1965), German middle-distance runner

F
 Frank Mertens (born 1961), German keyboardist and composer
 Franz Mertens (1840–1927), German mathematician 
 Mertens conjecture, Mertens function, Mertens' theorems, and Meissel–Mertens constant
 Franz Carl Mertens (1764–1831), German botanist

G
 Gregory Mertens  (1991–2015), Belgian footballer

H
 Helmut Mertens (1917–1984), German fighter ace

J
 Jan Mertens the Younger (died ca. 1527), South Netherlandish painter
 Jan Mertens (1904–1964), Belgian cyclist.
 Jan Mertens (1916–2000), Dutch politician
 Jan Mertens (born 1995), Belgian footballer
 Jean-François Mertens (1946–2012), Belgian game theorist known
 Mertens-stable equilibrium, Mertens' voting game
 Jerry Mertens (born 1936), American football cornerback 
 Jim Mertens (born 1947), American football player
 John J. Mertens (1869 – >1924), South Dakota politician
 Joseph Mertens (1921–2007), Belgian archaeologist

K
 Karl Heinrich Mertens (1796–1830), German botanist and naturalist
 Klaus Mertens (born 1949), German bass singer
 Klaus Mertens (born 1950), German artist

L
 Lennart Mertens (born 1992), Belgian footballer
 Linda Mertens (born 1978), Belgian singer
 Lothar Mertens (1959–2006), German historian

M
 Michael Mertens (born 1965), German shot putter

P
 Peter Mertens (born 1969), Belgian author and politician
 Pierre Mertens (born 1939), Belgian writer
 Pieter Mertens (born 1980), Belgian road bicycle racer
   Peter Mertens    (born 1944)  Canadian politician

R
 René Mertens (1922–2014), Belgian racing cyclist
 Robert Mertens (1894–1975), German herpetologist
  Mertens' water monitor
  Robert Mertens's day gecko

S
 Sibylle Mertens-Schaaffhausen (1797–1857), German art collector and musician
 Stéphane Mertens (born 1959), Belgian motorcycle road racer

T
 Tim Mertens (born 1986), Belgian racing cyclist

W
 Wim Mertens (born 1953), Belgian musician

Y
 Yannick Mertens (born 1987), Belgian tennis player

Z
 Zenia Mertens (born 2001), Belgian footballer

Fictional characters
Finn Mertens, main protagonist of the American animated television series Adventure Time
Mertens, the protagonist of the 1998 PlayStation video game Colony Wars: Vengeance

See also
 Meertens
 Merten (name)
 Merten

References

Patronymic surnames
Surnames of Belgian origin
Dutch-language surnames
Surnames from given names